Zoren Lim Legaspi (born January 30, 1972) is a Filipino actor and television director. He is best known for appearing in several television shows such as Ika-6 na Utos, Mulawin, Now and Forever: Ganti, Majika, Enchanted Garden, Glamorosa, Forevermore, Healing Hearts, Encantadia, Sirkus, Kapag Nahati ang Puso, Sahaya, Bilangin Ang Bituin Sa Langit and Apoy sa Langit.

He is currently an exclusive contract artist of GMA Network, as well as the network's talent management arm Sparkle GMA Artist Center alongside his twin children.

Personal life
Zoren comes from a family of Filipino celebrities. His father, Lito Legaspi (1942-2019), and brothers, Kier and Brando, are all actors. His spouse, Carmina Villaroel, is a movie and television actress. They have a twin children named Mavy and Cassy.

Outside of his showbiz career, he is a hobbyist for his love of motorcycles.

Career
He was once a leading man of beauty queen/actress Ruffa Gutierrez who was his ex-girlfriend. He was a member of That's Entertainment as a matinee idol. He was nominated for a Best Supporting Actor Award for his performance in the movie The Fatima Buen Story in the Gawad Urian Awards of 1995.

Legaspi directed for GMA Network programs like Fantastikids, Fantastic Man, Wag Kukurap and Atlantika. He made his film directorial debut for Ultraelectromagnetic Love of Regal Films which was to be shown in 2008.

He was a minor character in Agua Bendita aired on ABS-CBN.

Legaspi returned to GMA with his partner Carmina on a new talk show, Love ni Mister, Love ni Misis. This was his first hosting on TV and first talk show on GMA. The show premiered August 9, 2010.

Zoren returned to TV5 as host in Paparazzi with his co-hosts Ruffa Gutierrez, Shalala, Christy Fermin and Mo Twister. This was Zoren's second hosting on TV after Love Ni Mister, Love Ni Misis aired on GMA Network in 2010.

Zoren returns again to drama via Glamorosa with grand slam best actress Lorna Tolentino and former Palmolive endorser Alice Dixson. The show premiered November 2011.

On November 2012, Carmina and Zoren had their wedding, and the ABS-CBN had their special coverage of their wedding that aired November 24, 2012 entitled Zoren-Carmina: Always Forever, A Wedding Like No Other. The idea of a surprise proposal followed by a flashmob-style instant wedding was inspired by a remarkably similar episode of the U.S. television show "Mobbed" hosted by Howie Mandel.

On 2016, Legaspi returned to GMA Network, since his guesting on Marian Rivera's program, Yan Ang Morning!, his wife Carmina Villarroel, also returned to the network in 2017.

On March 15, 2018, Legaspi signed a contract with GMA Artist Center, after he returned to the network in 2016. He returned to GMA three times. Legaspi's first return to the network was late 2010, he moved back to GMA again for the second time in 2015 and the third time in 2016.

Filmography

Film
Wooly Booly: Ang Classmate Kong Alien (1989)
Student Body (1990)
Tora Tora, Bang Bang Bang (1990)
I Have 3 Eggs (1990)
Island of Desire (1990) as Jimmy Boy
Pido Dida 2: Kasal Na (1991)
Ipaglaban Mo Ako Boy Topak (1991) 
Pretty Boy Hoodlum (1991) 
Disgrasyada (1991) 
Shotgun Banjo (1992) 
Tikboy Tikas at ang Mga Batang Krhoaks (1993)
Bala at Lipstick (1993)
Massacre Files (1994)
Multo in the City (1994)
Silya Eletrika (1994) Viva Films
Alyas Boy Ama: Tirador (1994) - Moviestars Production 
Hataw Tatay Hataw (1994)
The Fatima Buen Story (1995)
Melencio Magat: Dugo Laban Dugo (1995)
Kailanman (1996)
Sandata (1996)
Duwelo (1996)
Bandido (1997)
Baril sa Baril (1997)
Matang Agila (1997)
Kung Marunong Kang Magdasal, Umpisahan Mo Na (1997)
Daniel Eskultor (1997)
Desperate Hours (1998)
Kahit Mabuhay Kang Muli (1998)
The Resort Murders (1998)
Alyas Big Time (1999)
Markado (1999)
Elias Marengo: Bayolente (1999)
Ang Boyfriend Kong Pari (1999)
Nag-aapoy Na Laman (2000)
Baliktaran (2000)
Laban Kung Laban (2000)
Testigo (2000)
Hindi Sisiw ang Kalaban Mo (2001)
Xtreme Warriors (2001)
The Cory Quirino Kidnap Files (2002)
Mano Po 2: My Home (2003)
Mulawin: The Movie (2005)
Pacquiao: The Movie (2006)
Inang Yaya (2006)
Isang Araw Lang (2011)
My Big Bossing's Adventures (2014)
Etiquette for Mistresses (2015)
Our Mighty Yaya (2017)
Miss Q & A (2020)

Television

Credits

Accolades

Awards and nominations
Gawad Urian - Best Supporting Actor for The Fatima Buen Story (nominated)

References

External links

Sparkle GMA Artist Center profile

1972 births
Living people
Filipino male child actors
Filipino male film actors
Filipino male television actors
Filipino television directors
Male actors from Manila
That's Entertainment (Philippine TV series)
GMA Network personalities
GMA Network (company) people
ABS-CBN personalities
TV5 (Philippine TV network) personalities